Kreis Adelnau was a county in the southern administrative district of Posen, in the Prussian province of Posen.

Military command 
Kreis Adelnau was part of the military command in Posen at Ostrowo.

Court system 
The main court was in Ostrowo, with lower courts in Aldenau and Ostrowo.

Civil registry offices 
In 1905, these civil registry offices served the following towns in Kreis Adelnau:  
Adelnau
Klein Topola
Raschkow
Danischen
Ludwikow
Sulmierzyce

Police districts
In 1905, these police districts served towns in Kreis Adelnau:   
Adelnau       
Adelnau West   
Schwarzwald           
Adelnau Ost   
Raschkow       
Sulmierzyce

Catholic churches 
In 1905, these Catholic parish churches served towns in Kreis Adelnau:   
Adelnau       
Kotlow       
Ostrowo       
Raschkow       
Skrzebow       
Szczury    
Hanswalde     
Lewkow       
Pogrzybow     
Schildberg     
Sulmierzyce

Protestant churches 
In 1905, Protestant parish churches served towns in Kreis Adelnau:   
Adelnau       
Krotoschin       
Ostrowo       
Raschkow       
Schwarzwald

References 

http://www.geschichte-on-demand.de/pos_adelnau.html
Gemeindeverzeichnis des Kreises Adelnau 1910

Adelnau